Gold Butte is a place name commonly used in Nevada.

Gold Butte may also refer to:

Places
 Gold Butte, a 5,049 ft (1,539 m) mountain peak
 Gold Butte, Nevada, a ghost town
 Gold Butte Mining District
 Gold Butte National Monument (GBNM), a part of the National Conservation Lands System within the Gold Butte region
 Gold Butte region, a general area bounded by the Virgin River to the west and north, Colorado River to the south, and Colorado Plateau to the east.
 Gold Butte wash, a surface feature

Film and literature
 Armageddon at Gold Butte by Terrell L. Bowers, an American novel
 Judgment at Gold Butte by Terrell L. Bowers, an American novel
 The Prehistory of Gold Butte: A Virgin River Hinterland, Clark County, Nevada by Kelly McGuire, William Hildebrandt, Amy Gilreath and Jerome King, an American non-fiction book

Geology
 Gold Butte Granite, a rock type

Plants
 Gold Butte moss (Didymodon nevadensis), a bryophyte

Other uses
 Friends of Gold Butte, a non-profit organization